Why Should I Care may refer to:

 "Why Should I Care", a song recorded by Toni Braxton from the album Secrets (Toni Braxton album)
 "Why Should I Care", a song recorded by  Diana Krall from the album When I Look in Your Eyes
 "Why Should I Care", a song recorded by Sara Evans from the album Born to Fly